Hesson is a surname. Notable people with the surname include:

Audrey Dear Hesson (born 1929), Canadian practical craft artist
Mike Hesson (born 1974), New Zealand cricket coach
Myles Hesson (born 1990), British basketball player
Samuel Rollin Hesson (1829–1915), Irish-born merchant and politician
Shelley Hesson (born 1976), New Zealand sailor